Tandy & Foster was an American architectural firm active from 1908 to 1914 in New York and New Jersey, based in New York City.

Founded in 1908 by Vertner Woodson Tandy (1885–1949) and George Washington Foster (1866–1923). Tandy was the first African-American architect licensed by the State of New York and Foster was among the first African-American architects licensed by the State of New Jersey in 1908, and later New York (1916). Tandy and Foster dissolved their partnership in 1914 and thereafter both practiced privately, Foster attaining his license in New York by 1915.

Works
St. Philip's Episcopal Church (Harlem, New York) (1910), 204 West 134th Street

References	

Design companies established in 1908
Design companies disestablished in 1914
Gothic Revival architects
American ecclesiastical architects
African-American architects
Companies based in Manhattan
Defunct architecture firms based in New York City
1908 establishments in New York (state)
1914 disestablishments in New York (state)
American companies disestablished in 1914
American companies established in 1908